Elena Zennaro (born 27 September 1942) is a retired Italian breaststroke swimmer. She competed in the 200 m event at the 1956 and 1960 Summer Olympics, but failed to reach the finals.

References

1942 births
Living people
Italian female breaststroke swimmers
Swimmers at the 1956 Summer Olympics
Swimmers at the 1960 Summer Olympics
Olympic swimmers of Italy
20th-century Italian women